The 2021 Atlantic 10 Conference men's soccer tournament was the postseason men's soccer tournament for the Atlantic 10 Conference held from November 6 through November 14, 2021. The quarterfinals of the tournament were held at campus sites, while the semifinals and final took place at Hermann Stadium in Saint Louis, Missouri. The eight-team single-elimination tournament consisted of three rounds based on seeding from regular season conference play. The defending tournament champions were the Fordham Rams.  Fordham was unable to defend their title, falling to Saint Louis in the Semifinals.  Saint Louis would go on to win the tournament, defeating  2–1 in the Final.  This was the Billikens' third overall tournament title, and the first for head coach Kevin Kalish. As tournament champions, Saint Louis earned the Atlantic 10's automatic berth into the 2021 NCAA Division I men's soccer tournament.

Seeding 

The top eight teams in the regular season earned a spot in the tournament. Teams were seeded based on regular season conference record and tiebreakers were used to determine seedings of teams that finished with the same record. Rhode Island scored more points against common opponents and therefore earned the second seed, while Saint Joseph's was the third seed. Another tiebreaker was required to determine the fourth and fifth seeds as Fordham and VCU finished with identical 4–3–1 records. Fordam won the regular season matchup between the teams and was therefore the fourth seed, while VCU was the fifth seed. Duquesne scored more points against common opponents and was awarded the sixth seed, while Davidson would be the seventh seed. Dayton earned the tiebreaker for the eighth seed over UMass and George Washington due to head-to-head results between the three teams.

Bracket

Source:

Schedule

Quarterfinals

Semifinals

Final

Statistics

Goalscorers

All Tournament Team 

Source:

MVP in bold

References 

 
Atlantic 10 Men's Soccer Tournament